Learchis ignis is a species of sea slug, specifically an aeolid nudibranch. It is a marine gastropod mollusc in the family Facelinidae.

Distribution
This species was described from Bay of Charagato, northeast of Cubagua Island, Venezuela.

References

Facelinidae
Gastropods described in 2013